Chief marshal of the branch was a senior military rank of the Soviet Armed Forces. It was immediately above the rank of Marshal of the branch. Both ranks were equal to general of the army.

History
The ranks of chief marshal of aviation, artillery, armoured troops, engineer troops, and signals were established on 27 October 1943. The three former branches had already had (since 4 February 1943) the corresponding ranks of marshal; in the two latter branches the ranks of marshal and of chief marshal were established simultaneously. When the rank of chief marshal was established, the size of the shoulder board's stars for all marshals except the rank of Marshal of the Soviet Union were made about 10mm smaller, and for chief marshals, the star was surrounded by a laurel wreath. On the uniform tie, chief marshals wore the marshal's star of the 2nd level. During the next forty years, the ranks of chief marshal were conferred mainly on deputy defense ministers – commanders of the corresponding branch. The ranks of chief marshal of engineer troops and chief marshal of signals, abolished in 1984, were never conferred on anybody. No chief marshal promotions were conferred after 1984. The youngest chief marshal was aviator Golovanov, 40 when promoted in 1944. Three of thirteen people who held the chief marshal rank did not retire normally: Novikov was imprisoned for seven years; Nedelin perished in the flame of an exploded rocket; Varentsov was accused of heedlessness, dismissed and degraded (his subordinate, Oleg Penkovsky, had been found to be a spy).

Shoulder boards & epaulettes

List of chief marshals

Chief marshals of the artillery
Nikolai Nikolaevich Voronov (5 May 1899 – 28 February 1968); appointed 21 February 1944.
Mitrofan Ivanovich Nedelin (9 November 1902 – 24 October 1960); appointed 8 May 1959.
Sergei Sergeevich Varentsov (10 August 1901 – 1 March 1971); appointed 6 May 1961.
Vladimir Fedorovich Tolubko (25 November 1914 – 17 June 1989); appointed 25 March 1983.

Chief marshals of the aviation
Alexander Alexandrovich Novikov (6 November 1900 – 3 December 1976); appointed 21 February 1944; served as commander of the Soviet Air Force from 1942 to 1946.
Alexander Evgenievich Golovanov (7 August 1904 – 22.09.1975); appointed 19 August 1944.
Pavel Fedorovich Zhigarev (19 January 1900 – 2 October 1963); appointed 11 March 1955; served as commander of the Soviet Air Force from 1949 to 1957.
Konstantin Andreevich Vershinin (3 June 1900 – 30 December 1973); appointed 8 May 1959; served as commander of the Soviet Air Force from 1957 to 1969.
Pavel Stepanovich Kutakhov (16 August 1914 – 3 December 1984); appointed March 1972; served as commander of the Soviet Air Force from 1969 to 1984.
Boris Pavlovich Bugaev (29 July 1923 – 13 January 2007); appointed 1977; served as Minister of Civil Aviation of the USSR from 1970 to 1987.
Alexander Ivanovich Koldunov (20 September 1923 – 9 June 1992); appointed 1984; served as commander of Soviet Air Defence Forces from 1978 to 1987.

Chief marshals of the armored troops
Pavel Alexeevich Rotmistrov (6 July 1901 – 16 April 1982); appointed 28 April 1962.
Hamazasp Khachaturovich Babadzhanian (18 February 1906 – 1 November 1977); appointed  29 April 1975.

See also
Marshal of the Soviet Union
Marshal of the branch
Ranks and rank insignia of the Soviet Armed Forces 1943–1955, and 1955–1991

References

Military ranks of Russia
Military ranks of the Soviet Union